Pseudolaguvia spicula is a species of sisorid catfish from the Surma-Meghna River system in India and Bangladesh.

References

Catfish of Asia
Fish of India
Taxa named by Heok Hee Ng
Taxa named by Lalramliana
Fish described in 2010
Erethistidae